De Morgan is a small lunar impact crater that is located in the central region of the Moon, midway between the crater D'Arrest two crater diameters to the south, and Cayley to the north. Its diameter is 9.7 km. It is named after British logician Augustus De Morgan.

This crater is circular and bowl-shaped, with a small interior floor at the midpoint between the conical, sloping inner wall.

References

External links
De Morgan at The Moon Wiki

Other articles
  - includes a couple of craters such as De Morgan (sometimes as de Morgan)

Impact craters on the Moon